The Lomas Open was a golf tournament on the PGA of Argentina Tour, formerly the principal professional golf tour in Argentina. The tournament has been played only ten times, the first in 1964, it has always been held at the Lomas Athletic Golf Club, in Buenos Aires, Buenos Aires Province. It was last held in 2005.

Winners

External links
Profesionales de Golf de Argentina – official site

Golf tournaments in Argentina